Uzbek (Perso-Arabic script:), formerly known as Chagatai Turki, is a Turkic language spoken by Uzbeks. It is the official, and national language of Uzbekistan. Uzbek is spoken as either native or second language by 44 million people around the world (L1+L2), making it the second-most widely spoken Turkic language after Turkish. There are two major variants of Uzbek language, Northern Uzbek spoken in Uzbekistan, Kyrgyzstan, Kazakhstan, Tajikistan, Turkmenistan and China and Southern Uzbek spoken in Afghanistan and Pakistan.

Uzbek belongs to the Eastern Turkic or Karluk branch of the Turkic language family. External influences include Arabic, Persian and Russian. Unlike other Turkic languages, vowel harmony is nigh-completely lost in modern Standard Uzbek, though it is (albeit somewhat less strictly) still observed in its dialects, as well as its sister Karluk language Uyghur.

In February 2021, the Uzbek government announced that Uzbekistan plans to fully transition the Uzbek language from the Cyrillic script to a Latin-based alphabet by 1 January 2023. Similar deadlines had been extended several times.

Classification 

Uzbek is a member of the Karluk languages, a sub-group of Turkic languages, belonging to the western branch, while the eastern variety carrying the name Uyghur. Since the family is classified to be a dialect continuum, it can be noted that it is found to be the most suitable variety or dialect to be understood by the most number of various Turkic language speakers, despite it being heavily Persianized, excluding the Siberian Turkic languages.

A high degree of mutual intelligibility found between certain specific Turkic languages, geographically located close or sometimes further from the area where Uzbek is spoken, has allowed the speakers of Uzbek to (with ease) comprehend various other distantly related languages.

Number of speakers 
Uzbek, being the most widely spoken language of the whole of Central Asia, is also spoken by smaller ethnic groups in the country and in neighbouring countries. As the language remains the only declared official language of the Republic of Uzbekistan, in the autonomous Republic of Karakalpakstan the language is taught at schools along their native language Karakalpak. Besides, ethnic Karakalpaks are exposed to the Uzbek language through media. The majority of TV channels are regulated in the Uzbek language, improving the ethnic group's understanding of Uzbek, excluding the mutual intelligibility.

The language is spoken by other ethnic groups outside Uzbekistan. The popularity of Uzbek media, including Uzbekfilm and RizanovaUz, has spread among the Post-soviet states, particularly in Central Asia in recent years. Since Uzbek is the dominant language in the Osh Region of Kyrgyzstan (and mothertongue of the city Osh), like the rest of Eastern, Southern and South-Eastern Kyrgyzstan (Jalal-Abad Region), the ethnic Kyrgyzes are, too, exposed to Uzbek, and some speak it fluently. This is a common situation in the rest of Central Asian republics, including: the Turkistan region of Kazakhstan, northern Daşoguz Welaýat of Turkmenistan, Sughd region and other regions of Tajikistan. This puts the number of L2 speakers of Uzbek at a varying 1–5 million speakers.

The Uzbek language has a special status in countries that are common destination for immigration for Uzbekistani citizens. Other than Uzbekistan and other Central Asian Republics, the ethnic Uzbeks most commonly choose the Russian Federation in search of work. Most of them however, are seasonal workers, whose numbers vary greatly among residency within the Russian Federation. According to Russian government statistics, 4.5 million workers from Uzbekistan, 2.4 million from Tajikistan, and 920,000 from Kyrgyzstan were working in Russia in 2021, with around 5 million being ethnic Uzbeks.

Estimates of the number of native speakers of Uzbek vary widely, from 35 up to 40 million. Ethnologue estimates put the number of native speakers at 35 million across all the recognized dialects. The Swedish national encyclopedia, Nationalencyklopedin, estimates the number of native speakers to be 38 million,
and the CIA World Factbook estimates 30 million. Other sources estimate the number of speakers of Uzbek to be 34 million in Uzbekistan, 4.5 million in Afghanistan, 1,630,000 in Pakistan, 1,500,000 in Tajikistan, about 1 million in Kyrgyzstan, 600,000 in Kazakhstan, 600,000 in Turkmenistan, and 300,000 in Russia.

Etymology and background 

Historically, the language under the name "Uzbek" was referred to a totally different language of Kipchak origin. The language was generally similar to the neighbouring Kazakh, more or less identical lexically, phonetically and grammatically. It was dissimilar to the area's indigenous and native language, known as Turki, until it was changed to Chagatai by western scholars due to its origins from the Chagatai Khanate.
The ethnonym of the language itself now means "a language spoken by the Uzbeks", though Edward A. Allworth argued that this "badly distorted the literary history of the region" and was used to give authors such as the 15th-century author Ali-Shir Nava'i an Uzbek identity.

History 
 
Turkic speakers probably settled the Amu Darya, Syr Darya and Zarafshan river basins from at least 600–650 CE, gradually ousting or assimilating the speakers of Eastern Iranian languages who previously inhabited Sogdia, Bactria and Khwarazm. The first Turkic dynasty in the region was that of the Kara-Khanid Khanate in the 9th–12th centuries, who were a confederation of Karluks, Chigils, Yaghma and other tribes.

Uzbek can be considered the direct descendant or a later form of Chagatai, the language of great Turkic Central Asian literary development in the realm of Chagatai Khan, Timur (Tamerlane), and the Timurid dynasty (including the early Mughal rulers of India). The language was championed by Ali-Shir Nava'i in the 15th and 16th centuries. Nava'i was the greatest representative of Chagatai language literature. He significantly contributed to the development of the Chagatai language and its direct descendant Uzbek and is widely considered to be the founder of Uzbek literature. Ultimately based on the Karluk variant of the Turkic languages, Chagatai contained large numbers of Persian and Arabic loanwords. By the 19th century it was rarely used for literary composition, but disappeared only in the early 20th century.

Uzbek ruler Shaybani Khan wrote poetry under the pseudonym "Shibani". A collection of poems by Shaybani Khan, written in the Central Asian Turkic literary language, is currently kept in the Topkapi manuscript collection in Istanbul. The manuscript of his philosophical and religious work: "Bahr ul-Khudo", written in the Central Asian Turkic literary language in 1508, is located in London. Shaybani-khan's nephew Ubaydulla Khan skillfully recited the Koran and provided it with commentaries in the Turkic language. Ubaydulla himself wrote poetry in Turkic, Persian and Arabic under the literary pseudonym Ubaydiy.

For the Uzbek political elite of the 16th century, the Turki language was native. For example, the leader of the semi-nomadic Uzbeks, Sheibani Khan (1451–1510), wrote poems in the Central Asian Turkic (Chagatai) language.

The Uzbek poet Turdiy (17th century) in his poems, written in the Turki literary language, called for the unification of the divided Uzbek tribes: Although our people are divided, but these are all Uzbeks of ninety-two tribes. We have different names – we all have the same blood. We are one people, and we should have one law. Floors, sleeves and collars – it's all – one robe, So the Uzbek people are united, may they be in peace.

Sufi Allayar (1633–1721) was an outstanding Uzbek theologian and one of the Sufi leaders of the Bukhara Khanate. He showed his level of knowledge by writing a book in the Turki language "Sabatul-azhizin". Sufi Allayar was often read and highly appreciated in Central Asia.

The term Uzbek as applied to language has meant different things at different times. 
 Uzbek was a vowel-harmonised Kipchak language spoken by descendants of those who arrived in Transoxiana in medieval period, who lived mainly around Bukhara and Samarkand.
 Turki was a Karluk language spoken by the older settled Turkic populations of the region (called Sarts) in the Fergana Valley and the Qashqadaryo Region, and in some parts of what is now the Samarqand Region; it contained a heavier admixture of Persian and Arabic, and did not have vowel harmony. It became the standard Uzbek language and the official dialect of Uzbekistan.

According to the Kazakh scholar Serali Lapin, who lived at the end of the 19th – beginning of the 20th century, “there is no special Sart language different from Uzbek Russian researchers of the second half of the 19th century, like L. N. Sobolev, believed that: “Sart is not a special tribe, as many tried to prove. Sart is indifferently called both Uzbek and Tajik, who live in the city and are engaged in trade.

In Khanate of Khiva, Sarts spoke a highly Oghuz Turkified form of Turki which belonged to the Karluk branch of the Turkic language family. Edward A. Allworth argued that this "badly distorted the literary history of the region" and was used to give authors such as the 15th-century author Ali-Shir Nava'i an Uzbek identity.
All three dialects continue to exist within modern spoken Uzbek.

Writing systems 

Uzbek has been written in a variety of scripts throughout history:
 1000-1920s: The traditional Arabic script, first in the Qarakhanid standard and next in the Chagatai standard. This is seen as the golden age of the Uzbek language and literary history. 
 1920–1928: the Arabic-based Yaña imlâ alphabet.
 1928–1940: the Latin-based Yañalif was imposed officially.
 1940–1992: the Cyrillic script was used officially.
 Since 1992: Switch back to Latin script, with heavy holdover usage of Cyrillic.
 2019: reform of the Latin script (planned) 
 2021: reform of the Latin script (planned) 

Despite the official status of the Latin script in Uzbekistan, the use of Cyrillic is still widespread, especially in advertisements and signs. In newspapers, scripts may be mixed, with headlines in Latin and articles in Cyrillic. The Arabic script is no longer used in Uzbekistan except symbolically in limited texts or for the academic studies of Chagatai (Old Uzbek).

In the western Chinese region of Xinjiang, in northern Afghanistan and in Pakistan, where there is an Uzbek minority, the Arabic-based script is still used.

Phonology 
Words are usually oxytones (i.e. the last syllable is stressed), but certain endings and suffixal particles are not stressed.

Vowels 
Standard Uzbek has six vowel phonemes. Contrary to many Turkic languages, Uzbek no longer has vowel harmony.

Consonants

Grammar 
As a Turkic language, Uzbek is null subject, agglutinative and has no articles and no noun classes (gender or otherwise). The word order is subject–object–verb (SOV).

In Uzbek, there are two main categories of words: nominals (equivalent to nouns, pronouns, adjectives and some adverbs) and verbals (equivalent to verbs and some adverbs).

Nouns 
Plurals are formed by suffix -lar. Nouns take the -ni suffix as an definite article, unsuffixed nouns are understood as indefinite. The dative case ending -ga changes to -ka when the noun ends in -k, or -qa when the noun ends in -q or -g‘ (notice *tog‘qa → toqqa). The possessive suffixes change the final consonants -k and -q to voiced -g and -g‘, respectively (yurak → yuragim). Unlike neighbouring Turkmen and Kazakh languages, there is no irregularity on forming cases after possessive cases (uyida "in his/her/its house", as opposed to Turkmen öýünde).

Verbs 
Uzbek verbs are also inflected for number and person of the subject, and it has more periphrases. Uzbek uses some of the inflectional (simple) verbal tenses:
{| class="wikitable"
|+ Non-finite tense suffixes
! Function
! Suffix
|-
! Infinitive
| -moq
|}
{| class="wikitable"
|+ Finite tense suffixes
! Function
! Suffix
|-
! Present-future
| -a/y
|-
! Focal present
| -yap
|-
! Momentary present
| -yotir
|-
! Progressive present
| -moqda
|-
! Definite past
| -di
|-
! Indefinite past
| -gan
|-
! Indirective past
| -ib
|-
! Definite future
| -(y)ajak
|-
! Obligatory future
| -adigan/ydigan
|-
! rowspan=2 | Imperative
| -∅
|-
| -ing (formal)
|}

Pronouns

Word order 
The word order in the Uzbek language is subject–object–verb (SOV), like all other Turkic languages. Unlike in English, the object comes before the verb and the verb is the last element of the sentence.

Influences 
The influence of Islam, and by extension, Arabic, is evident in Uzbek loanwords. There is also a residual influence of Russian, from the time when Uzbeks were under the rule of the Russian Empire and the Soviet Union. There are a lot of Russian loanwords in Uzbek, particularly when related to technical and modern terms, as well everyday and sociopolitical terms. Most importantly, Uzbek vocabulary, phraseology and pronunciation has been heavily influenced by Persian through its historic roots. Uzbek has in turn also influenced Tajik (a variety of Persian). Of the Turkic languages, Uzbek is perhaps the one most strongly influenced by Persian.

Dialects 

Uzbek can be roughly divided into three dialect groups. The Karluk dialects, centered on Tashkent, Samarkand, Bukhara, and the Ferghana Valley, are the basis for the standard Uzbek language. This dialect group shows the most influence of Persian vocabulary, particularly in the important Turkic cities of Bukhara and Samarkand. The Kipchak dialect, spoken from the Surxondaryo region through north-central Uzbekistan into Karakalpakstan, shows significant influence from the Kipchak Turkic languages, particularly in the mutation of [j] to [ʑ] as in Kazakh and Kyrgyz. The Oghuz dialect, spoken mainly in Khorezm along the Turkmenistan border, is notable for the mutation of word-initial [k] to [g].

By country

Turkmenistan 
In Turkmenistan since the 2000s the government conducted a forced "Turkmenization" of ethnic Uzbeks living in the country. In the Soviet years and in the 1990s, the Uzbek language was used freely in Turkmenistan. There were several hundred schools in the Uzbek language, many newspapers were published in this language. Now there are only a few Uzbek schools in the country, as well as a few newspapers in Uzbek. Despite this, the Uzbek language is still considered to be one of the recognized languages of national minorities in this country. Approximately 300,000–600,000 Uzbeks live in Turkmenistan. Most of the Uzbek speakers live in Dashoghuz Velayat, as well as in Lebap Velayat and partly in Ashghabad.

Russia 
Uzbek is one of the many recognized languages of national minorities in Russia. More than 400 thousand Uzbeks are citizens of the Russian Federation and live in this country. Also in Russia there are 2 to 6 million Uzbeks from the Central Asian republics (mainly Uzbekistan, Kyrgyzstan and Tajikistan) who are immigrants and migrants. Large diasporas of Uzbeks live in such large cities of Russia as Moscow, Saint Petersburg, Yekaterinburg, Novosibirsk, Kazan, Volgograd, Samara, Rostov-on-Don, Perm, Nizhny Novgorod, Chelyabinsk, Vladivostok, Ufa, Krasnoyarsk, Omsk, Krasnodar, Voronezh, Saratov and Tyumen. Signs in Uzbek are often found in these cities. Signs refer mainly to various restaurants and eateries, barbershops, shops selling fruits, vegetables and textile products. There is a small clinic, where signs and labels in the Uzbek language. There are also illegal signs in Uzbek on the streets of these cities with underground sex services ("Call girls"). Uzbeks in Russia prefer to use the Cyrillic Uzbek alphabet, but in recent years Uzbek youth in Russia are also actively using the Latin Uzbek alphabet. Small newspapers in Uzbek are published in large cities of Russia. Some instructions for immigrants and migrants are duplicated, including in Uzbek. Uzbek language is studied by Russian students in the faculties of Turkology throughout Russia. The largest Uzbek language learning centers in Russia are located in the universities of Moscow and Saint Petersburg. There are also many Russians who are interested in and love the Uzbek language and culture and who study this language for themselves. Uzbek is one of the most studied languages among the many languages of the former USSR in Russia. Native speakers of Uzbek in Russia usually use in their vocabulary a lot of words from Russian.

Uzbek language researchers 
Scientific interest in the history of the Uzbek language arose in the 19th century among European and Russian orientalists. A. Vambery, V. Bartold, Sh. Lapin and others wrote about the history of the Uzbek language. Much attention was paid to the study of the history of the language in the Soviet period. E. Polivanov, N.Baskakov, A.Kononov, U. Tursunov, A. Mukhtarov, Sh. Rakhmatullaev and others wrote about the history of the Uzbek language among famous linguists.

See also 
 Chagatai language
 Southern Uzbek language
 Uzbek literature

Notes

References

Sources 

 
 
 
 
 
 
 
 
 
 Republic of Uzbekistan, Ministry of Higher and Middle Eductation. Lotin yozuviga asoslangan oʻzbek alifbosi va imlosi  (Latin writing based Uzbek alphabet and orthography), Tashkent Finance Institute: Tashkent, 2004.
 A. Shermatov. "A New Stage in the Development of Uzbek Dialectology" in Essays on Uzbek History, Culture and Language. Ed. Bakhtiyar A. Nazarov & Denis Sinor. Bloomington, Indiana, 1993, pp. 101–9.

External links 

 Converters
 Uzbek Cyrillic–Latin converter
 Uzbek Cyrillic-Latin text and website converter
 Uzbek Latin-Cyrillic text and website converter

 Dictionaries
 Dictionary of the Uzbek Language Volume I (А—Р)  (Tashkent, 1981)
 Dictionary of the Uzbek Language, Volume II (С—Ҳ)  (Tashkent, 1981)
 English-Uzbek and Uzbek-English online dictionary
 English-Uzbek and Uzbek-English online dictionary
 Russian-Uzbek and Uzbek-Russian online dictionary
 Uzbek<>Turkish dictionary (Pamukkale University)
 Ole Olufsen: "A Vocabulary of the Dialect of Bokhara"  (København 1905)

Grammar and orthography
 Introduction to the Uzbek Language, Mark Dickens
 Principal Orthographic Rules For The Uzbek Language, translation of Uzbekistan Cabinet of Minister's Resolution No. 339, of August 24, 1995
 Uzbek alphabet, Omniglot

 Learning/teaching materials
 Ona tili uz, a website about Uzbek
 Uzbek language materials, Uz-Translations

 
Agglutinative languages
Karluk languages
Turkic languages of Afghanistan
Turkic languages
Languages of Pakistan
Languages of Kazakhstan
Languages of Kyrgyzstan
Languages of Russia
Languages of Tajikistan
Languages of Turkmenistan
Languages of Uzbekistan
Languages of China
Articles citing Nationalencyklopedin